Antonio Alejandro Díaz Campos (born 26 April 2000) is a Chilean football player who plays as a left wing-back for O'Higgins F.C. in Chilean Primera División.

International career
He represented Chile U17 at two friendly matches against USA U17, at the 2017 South American U-17 Championship – he scored a goal and Chile was the runner-up – and at the 2017 FIFA U-17 World Cup. Also, he played all the matches and scored a goal for Chile U17 at the friendly tournament Lafarge Foot Avenir 2017 in France, better known as Tournament Limoges, where Chile became champion after defeating Belgium U18 and Poland U18 and drawing France U18.

He was in the Chile U20 squad for the 2019 South American U-20 Championship, making an appearance at the tournament against Brazil U20. In addition, with Chile U20 he won the gold medal in the 2018 South American Games.

Honours
Chile U17
Tournoi de Limoges: 2017

Chile U20
 South American Games Gold medal: 2018

References

External links
 
 Antonio Díaz at PlayMakerStats

2000 births
Living people
People from Rancagua
Chilean footballers
Chile youth international footballers
Chile under-20 international footballers
Chilean Primera División players
O'Higgins F.C. footballers
Association football defenders
South American Games gold medalists for Chile
South American Games medalists in football
Competitors at the 2018 South American Games